Günaydın (literally: "Good Morning") was a Turkish newspaper. It was established in 1968 by Haldun Simavi, and ceased publication in 1998.

A book on the newspaper was published in 2006, titled Türk Basınında Kayan Yıldız: Haldun Simavi'nin Günaydın'ı ("The Turkish Press's Shooting Star: Haldun Simavi's Günaydın").

Books 
 Tekin, Akgün (2006), Türk Basınında Kayan Yıldız: Haldun Simavi'nin Günaydın'ı, Doğan Kitap / Anı Dizisi.

References 

1968 establishments in Turkey
1998 disestablishments in Turkey
Defunct newspapers published in Turkey
Newspapers published in Istanbul
Publications established in 1968
Publications disestablished in 1998
Turkish-language newspapers
Daily newspapers published in Turkey